Oeneis alberta, the Alberta Arctic, is a butterfly of the family Nymphalidae. It is found from the Canadian prairie provinces east to southern Manitoba. Isolated populations are found along the Rocky Mountains in Colorado, New Mexico and Arizona.

The wingspan is 35–57 mm. The upperside is light yellow grey while the underside is light brown. Adults are on wing from May to June in one generation per year.

The larvae feed on bunch grass, possibly Festuca species. The species overwinters in the larval stage.

Subspecies
Oeneis alberta alberta (Manitoba, Saskatchewan, Alberta, British Columbia, Montana, North Dakota)
Oeneis alberta oslari Skinner, 1911 (Colorado)
Oeneis alberta capulinensis F.M. Brown, 1970 (New Mexico)
Oeneis alberta daura (Strecker, 1894) (Arizona)

References

Butterflies described in 1893
Oeneis
Butterflies of North America